AD 51 (LI) was a common year starting on Friday (link will display the full calendar) of the Julian calendar. At the time, it was known as the Year of the Consulship of Caesar and Scipio (or, less frequently, year 804 Ab urbe condita). The denomination AD 51 for this year has been used since the early medieval period, when the Anno Domini calendar era became the prevalent method in Europe for naming years.

Events

By place

Roman Empire 
 Emperor Claudius and future emperor Titus Flavius Vespasianus are Roman Consuls.
 Burrus, praetorian prefect (51–62 AD), is charged by Seneca with the education of Nero.
 In Britain, governor Publius Ostorius Scapula defeats Caratacus and the Silures in the territory of the Ordovices in central Wales. Caratacus seeks sanctuary with Cartimandua, queen of the Brigantes in northern England, but she is a Roman ally and hands him over to Ostorius. Despite the defeat, the Silures continue to fight.
 The captured Caratacus is exhibited in chains in Claudius' triumph in Rome, but his dignified demeanour persuades the emperor to spare his life and allow his family to live free in the capital for a short period of time.

Parthia 
 Vonones II dies a few months after he had ascended to the throne. His son Vologases I becomes king of the Parthian Empire.

By topic

Religion 
 Paul in Corinth. He remains for 18 months. He writes the epistles I and II to the Thessalonians.
 Paul of Tarsus begins his second mission (approximate date).
 The New Testament book 1 Thessalonians is written (possible date).
 In the Epistle to the Galatians, Paul supports the separation of Christianity and Judaism.

Births 
 October 24 – Titus Flavius Domitianus, Roman emperor (d. AD 96)

Deaths 
 Gotarzes II, king of the Parthian Empire
 Lucius Vitellius the Elder, Roman consul (b. 5 BC)
 Mithridates of Armenia, Roman client king
 Vonones II, king of the Parthian Empire

References 

0051